How Will I Laugh Tomorrow When I Can't Even Smile Today is the third studio album by American crossover thrash band Suicidal Tendencies. It was released on September 13, 1988 on Epic Records, the band's first album on that label. It was also their first album recorded with guitarist Mike Clark and their only release with bassist Bob Heathcote, who was replaced by Robert Trujillo in 1989.

Musical style
How Will I Laugh... is crucial to Suicidal Tendencies stylistic developments in that it sees the band abandoning most of their full-fledged punk influences in favor of a more thrash-oriented sound. One could see this stylistic changes in this album's predecessor Join the Army, but this album had a distinctly more defined metal sound, more complex and lengthy songs, and better production values.

The addition of a rhythm guitarist Mike Clark (who had played with vocalist Mike Muir in No Mercy, which was supposed to originally be a metal-only side project) changed the band's style heavily as well. Clark wrote much of the music for this album and gave lead guitarist Rocky George more soloing time, thus creating another factor in this album and future albums' more metal-oriented sound.

The album's back cover shows each member standing in front of the side of the Saint Sophia Cathedral in Los Angeles.

Reception 

Reviews for How Will I Laugh Tomorrow When I Can't Even Smile Today have been mostly positive. AllMusic's Steve Huey awards the album four-and-a-half stars out of five, and described it as "one of its best efforts". For the musical direction, Huey stated, "The band's thrashy fusion of its hardcore roots with speed metal was fully developed by this point, and Mike Muir's social commentary and self-analysis were as ragingly compelling and by turns amusing as ever." In the review made two months after the album release, RPM editors called the band one of the best of the current crop.

How Will I Laugh Tomorrow When I Can't Even Smile Today was moderately successful, peaking at number 111 on the US Billboard 200. It remained on that chart for eleven weeks. The album featured the singles "Trip at the Brain" and the title track, both of which managed to become successful with their target audiences.

In August 2014, Revolver placed the album on its "14 Thrash Albums You Need to Own" list.

Track listing

 Track notes: "Suicyco Mania" is exclusive to the CD version of the album and does not appear on the vinyl or cassette versions. A near instrumental version (removing all the vocals outside of the title chant) was released as the B-side of "Trip at the Brain" and can also be heard on the F.N.G. compilation.

Credits 

 Mike Muir – vocals
 Rocky George – lead guitar
 Mike Clark – rhythm guitar, contributing songwriter
 R.J. Herrera – drums
 Bob Heathcote – bass
 Cherokee Studios, Hollywood, California – recording location
 Mark Dodson – producer, engineer
 Suicidal Tendencies – producer
 Mike Bosley – engineer
 Mark "Weissguy" Weiss – photography

Chart positions

Album
Billboard (North America)

References

Suicidal Tendencies albums
1988 albums
Epic Records albums
Albums produced by Mark Dodson